The 1996 Canadian Figure Skating Championships took place from February 7 to 11 in Ottawa, Ontario. It is an annual figure skating competition held by Skate Canada, the nation's figure skating governing body. Skaters competed at the senior, junior, and novice levels in the disciplines of men's singles, ladies' singles, pair skating, and ice dancing. There was also a senior fours competition. The top finishers are named to Canada's world team, which competes at the 1996 World Championships and the 1996 World Junior Championships.

Senior results

Men

Ladies

Pairs

Ice dancing

Fours

External links
 1996 Canadian Figure Skating Championships results

Canadian Figure Skating Championships
Canadian Figure Skating Championships
1996 in Canadian sports
1996 in Ontario